The Montrose Group is a stratigraphic group, a set of geological rock strata of Paleocene age, found beneath the North Sea and locally onshore in southeastern England. It was originally described from offshore exploration wells in the North Sea. The Thanet Formation in the London Basin has more recently been assigned to the group.

References 

Geological groups of the United Kingdom
Paleocene Series of Europe